Ribeirinha is a civil parish in the municipality of Lajes do Pico in the Portuguese Autonomous Region of the Azores. It is the only parish in the municipality to be totally on the northern coast of the island. The population in 2011 was 374, in an area of 8.49 km2. It is the smallest parish in the municipality by area. It contains the localities Baixa, Biscoito, Ribeirinha and Terra Alta.

History
It was established in 1980, when it was carved from the neighboring civil parish of Piedade, with which it shares its border on the eastern coast.

References

Freguesias of Lajes do Pico